Yudychvumchorr is a peak in Murmansk Oblast, Russia. It is the highest point of the oblast and of the Kola Peninsula. The peak is also the highest point of the European side of the Russian Arctic, not counting Arctic islands.

The name of the mountain originated in the Sami language.

Description
The mountain rises in the southwestern sector of the Kola Peninsula. The Malaya Belaya river flows within a deep valley at the foot of the mountain in the south and southeast.

See also
 List of highest points of Russian federal subjects
 List of mountains and hills of Russia

References

External links
Wikimapia - Picture
#Юдычвумчорр #yudychvumchorr

Yudychvumchorr
Mountains of Murmansk Oblast
Sápmi